Vitaliy Volodymyrovych Parkhuts (born 18 January 1997) is a Ukrainian professional footballer who plays as a centre-back for Ukrainian club Prykarpattia Ivano-Frankivsk.

References

External links
 Profile on Prykarpattia Ivano-Frankivsk official website
 
 

1997 births
Living people
Ukrainian footballers
Association football defenders
NK Veres Rivne players
FC Lviv players
FC Karpaty Halych players
FC Prykarpattia Ivano-Frankivsk (1998) players
Ukrainian First League players
Ukrainian Second League players
Sportspeople from Ivano-Frankivsk Oblast